Marjorie Johnson (born August 9, 1919), the "Blue Ribbon Baker", is a popular baker from Robbinsdale, Minnesota.  First made famous through her guest appearances on KSTP radio's Garage Logic, she has since appeared on numerous talk shows, including  The Tonight Show with Jay Leno, The Rosie O'Donnell Show, The View, and The Kelly Clarkson Show in September 2019 at age 100. Johnson has won over 2,500 fair ribbons, including over 1,000 blue ribbons and numerous sweepstakes ribbons.

In 2007, she became the newest correspondent for The Tonight Show with Jay Leno. She brought her home-made cooking to such events as the MLB All-Star Game, the NBA All-Star Game, the Emmy Awards, and the Grammy Awards. Published the book The Road to Blue Ribbon Baking: With Marjorie in 2007.

On August 9, 2019, Johnson celebrated her 100th birthday.

References

External links

1919 births
Living people
People from Robbinsdale, Minnesota
American bakers
American centenarians
Women centenarians